The Tank Corps, National Army, was the stateside tank unit of the United States Army during and after World War I. Preceded by the Tank Service of the National Army of 15 February 1918 in the 65th Engineers at Camp Meade, the service was removed from the Engineer Corps and organized as the Tank Corps, National Army, with command transferring from Col H. H. Ferguson to Col Ira Clinton Welborn on 9 March.

Training facilities
On 6 March 1918, a Camp Colt, Pennsylvania, for training tank recruits, was established on the Gettysburg Battlefield at the former "Camp, United States Troops, Gettysburg, Pennsylvania." On 15 July 1918, Col William H Clopton Jr, arrived in the US and subsequently formed the 2nd stateside tank training center at Tobyhanna, Pennsylvania. Approximately 2000 Camp Colt men transferred to Tobyhanna, e.g., the 302nd & 326th Battalions), and Tobyhanna had 2 tanks and ~2200 men.

Another tank training center was opened at Camp Polk in September 1918 (a heavy battalion from Camp Colt transferred to "form the nucleus"). At Camp Colt in October the 310th Tank Center was established as were the 338th, 339th, & 346th Tank Battalions (John Montgomery Mahon was the commander of Camp Colt's 310 Brigade Headquarters.)

On 11 November 1918, the Tank Corps had 483 officers and 7700 enlisted men, and the consolidation of tank training had begun at Camp Benning when Dwight D. Eisenhower arrived from Camp Colt on 24 December 1918 (he remained until 15 March 1919, and about 250 Camp Colt soldiers were transferred to Camp Benning after the armistice.) On 26 December 1918, a portion of the Camp Polk tank school was transferred to Camp Benning "to work in conjunction with the Infantry school". Camp Benning tank troops were moved to Camp Meade from 19 to 21 February 1919; and Clopton was ordered to Camp Meade on 24 February 1919).

The "Office of Director of the Tank Corps" was absorbed by the command of Brigadier General Samuel D. Rockenbach on 15 August 1919 after Rockenbach returned from Europe on 19 July 1919 (he had arrived in Europe in June 1917).

Post-war disbandment
In 1919, General John J. Pershing, "appearing before a joint session of the Senate and House Committee on Military Affairs, suggested that the A.E.F. Tank Corps become an adjunct to the Infantry." The National Defense Act of 1920 disbanded the National Army and the remaining two heavy and four light tank battalions became part of the infantry.

References

Tank units and formations of the United States Army
Training units and formations of the United States Army
Army units and formations of the United States in World War I